Lee David Harrison (born 12 September 1971) is an English goalkeeping coach, currently working as Head of Goalkeeping at Wycombe Wanderers F.C. Harrison spent most of his career with Barnet, but he has played in over 400 League and Cup games in the course of his career with Gillingham, Fulham, Leyton Orient and Peterborough United.

Career 

Born in Billericay, Essex, Harrison, a goalkeeper, started his career at Charlton Athletic without making any first team appearances. From 1996 until 2003 he played 233 Football League games for Barnet and was Player of the Year for three consecutive seasons. After a £10,000 transfer to Leyton Orient where he played 65 League and Cup games – he moved to Peterborough United for the 2005–06 season, but in July 2006 returned to Barnet as player/coach. He was appointed club captain in July 2007.

In his second spell at the club, he attained the feat of making 300 league appearances for the club, honoured with a banner adorned on the North Terrace fence for the match against Rochdale in which he kept a clean sheet in a 0–0 draw. He was only the fifth player in the last 30 years to achieve this feat for Barnet.

Harrison was released at the end of the 2009/10 season and briefly joined Dagenham & Redbridge as a coach for their successful play-off campaign. Harrison signed a playing contract with Hayes & Yeading on 2 August 2010.

Coaching 

Harrison became a UEFA "A" qualified outfield coach at the age of 21, and is also a UEFA "A" qualified goalkeeper coach.

In May 2011, Harrison joined Newport County as assistant manager to Anthony Hudson and backup goalkeeper. Following the sacking of Hudson in September 2011 Harrison was appointed caretaker manager for one match, a 2–0 defeat at Darlington. Justin Edinburgh was appointed team manager on 4 October 2011 and Jimmy Dack appointed assistant manager, therefore Harrison was released from his contract.

On 2 August 2012, it was announced that Harrison had been appointed permanent goalkeeping coach at Wycombe Wanderers, after a period working at the club on a temporary basis.
Harrison was also listed as a player at Wycombe, taking shirt number 21. Harrison left Wycombe in January 2014 to take up a coaching role at Premier League West Ham United. He was replaced at Wycombe by Barry Richardson.

On 3 July 2015, Harrison returned to Leyton Orient as goalkeeper coach under the management of Ian Hendon. In January 2021, he returned to Wycombe Wanderers as their goalkeeping coach.

On 7 October 2022, it was announced that Lee Harrison would join Colchester United as First Team Goalkeeping coach, becoming new head coach Matt Bloomfield’s first addition to his backroom staff.

On 22 February 2023 Lee Harrison returned to Wycombe Wanderers as goalkeeping coach.

References

External links 

1971 births
Living people
People from Billericay
English footballers
Association football goalkeepers
Charlton Athletic F.C. players
Fulham F.C. players
Gillingham F.C. players
Barnet F.C. players
Peterborough United F.C. players
Leyton Orient F.C. players
Hayes & Yeading United F.C. players
Newport County A.F.C. players
Newport County A.F.C. managers
English Football League players
National League (English football) players
Wycombe Wanderers F.C. players
English football managers
Association football goalkeeping coaches
Newport County A.F.C. non-playing staff
Wycombe Wanderers F.C. non-playing staff
West Ham United F.C. non-playing staff
Leyton Orient F.C. non-playing staff
Colchester United F.C. non-playing staff